POS, Pos or PoS may refer to:

Linguistics
 Part of speech, the role that a word or phrase plays in a sentence
 Poverty of the stimulus, a linguistic term used in language acquisition and development
 Sayula Popoluca (ISO 639-3), an indigenous language spoken in Veracruz, Mexico

Music
 P.O.S (rapper) (born 1981), or Stefon Alexander, American hip hop artist
 Pain of Salvation, Swedish progressive metal band
 Posdnuos (born 1969), or Kelvin Mercer, New York hip-hop artist

Places
 Port of Spain, Trinidad and Tobago
 Piarco International Airport (IATA code), Piarco, Trinidad and Tobago
 Pomona (Amtrak station) (Amtrak station code), California, US

Science and technology
 Political opportunity structure, an approach to explain social movements
 Polycystic ovary syndrome, a disease of the ovaries
 Probability of success, in statistics
 Product of sums, a canonical form in Boolean algebra

Computing
 P/OS, operating system of DEC Professional PCs from Digital Equipment Corporation
 Packet over SONET/SDH, a communications protocol for transferring  packets over fiber networks
 PERQ Operating System, operating system for PERQ workstations
 Proof of space, a cryptocurrency blockchain distributed consensus method
 Proof of stake, a cryptocurrency blockchain distributed consensus method

Transportation
 Post Office Sorting Van, a type of rail vehicle used in a Travelling Post Office train
 SNCF TGV POS, a French high-speed train

Other uses
 Phi Omega Sigma (disambiguation), a Greek name for any of five different student organizations
 Piece of shit, a phrase considered vulgar and profane in Modern English
 Point of sale, location where payment is accepted
 Point of service plan, a type of managed care health insurance plan in the US
 Polytechnic Secondary School (Polytechnische Oberschule), the 10-year general educational system in East Germany
 Priory of Sion, a fictitious secret society
 Public open space, a planning term for an outdoor public forum

See also
 Post Office Square (disambiguation)